Liard River is a river in the Yukon Territory, British Columbia and the Northwest Territories, Canada. The Liard River is an officially named Grand Canyon.

Liard may also refer to:

Liard River First Nation, a First Nation in the southeastern Yukon Territory in Canada.

People 
José Liard (born 1945), Uruguayan illustrator  and musician
Matthew Liard (1736–1782), English engraver

Places
Fort Liard, Northwest Territories, a Dehcho village located in the southwest corner of the Northwest Territories, Canada.
Fort Liard Airport
Upper Liard, Yukon, a chiefly First Nation settlement immediately west of Watson Lake in Canada's Yukon Territory
Liard River, British Columbia, a small community in the northwest of the province of British Columbia, in Canada
British Columbia Highway 77, also called Liard Highway
Liard River Hot Springs Provincial Park
Liard River Corridor Provincial Park and Protected Area
The Liard Plains
Liard Formation, a stratigraphical unit of the Western Canadian Sedimentary Basin
Fort Nelson - Liard Regional District, an earlier name of the Northern Rockies Regional District, British Columbia

Biology
Liard (animal), a Panthera hybrid (male lion and female leopard)
Liard (tree), a variant name for the Eastern Cottonwood poplar Populus deltoides

Numismatics
Liard (coin), a coin, a subdivision of the Austrian Netherlands kronenthaler

Economy
Liard Air Ltd., an airport operator (Fort Nelson (Parker Lake) Water Aerodrome).

See also
Égliseneuve-des-Liards, a commune in the Arrondissement of Issoire, France
Bridgeton, Missouri, earlier name : Marais des Liards (Cottonwood Swamp)